Angram is a common place-name in Yorkshire, England.  It may refer to:

 Angram, Harrogate, a village in the parish of Long Marston near York, North Yorkshire
Angram, a former settlement in the parish of Stonebeck Up, Nidderdale, now in the district of Harrogate, North Yorkshire
Angram Reservoir
 Angram, Richmondshire, a village near Keld in North Yorkshire
 Angram Grange, a civil parish in Hambleton, North Yorkshire

Former populated places in North Yorkshire